Phyllonorycter cydoniella is a moth of the family Gracillariidae. It is known from Germany, Austria, the Czech Republic, Italy and Greece.

The larvae feed on Chaenomeles, Sorbus domestica and Sorbus torminalis. They mine the leaves of their host plant. They create an elongated, lower surface, tentiform mine with one strong fold in the lower epidermis. The pupa is made in a white cocoon. All frass is deposited in a clump in the mine.

References

cydoniella
Moths of Europe
Moths described in 1775